Hoagland is an unincorporated community in Logan County, Nebraska, United States.

History
A post office was established at Hoagland in 1912, and remained in operation until it was discontinued in 1944. The community was named for homesteader W. V. Hoagland.

References

Unincorporated communities in Logan County, Nebraska
Unincorporated communities in Nebraska